Donald Bell (1937–2003) was a Canadian journalist, who won the Stephen Leacock Award in 1973 for his book Saturday Night at the Bagel Factory. The book has also been credited with helping to make the bagel a staple of Montreal's food culture beyond the city's Jewish community alone. 

Based in Montreal, Bell was a columnist for Books in Canada and a contributor to various newspapers and magazines. He was an early popularizer of the theory that Thomas Neill Cream, a Canadian medical doctor, was the real Jack the Ripper, through pieces published in both The Criminologist and the Toronto Star.

References

1937 births
2003 deaths
20th-century Canadian non-fiction writers
20th-century Canadian male writers
Canadian newspaper journalists
Canadian male journalists
Writers from Montreal
Canadian humorists
Stephen Leacock Award winners